Matti Salkojärvi (born 3 October 1984) is a Finnish football player who formerly played for FCV. Matti was born in Jyväskylä.

See also
Football in Finland
List of football clubs in Finland

References
Guardian Football

1984 births
Living people
Finnish footballers
IFK Mariehamn players
JJK Jyväskylä players
Association football goalkeepers
Sportspeople from Jyväskylä
21st-century Finnish people